The 1960 Kent State Golden Flashes football team was an American football team that represented Kent State University in the Mid-American Conference (MAC) during the 1960 NCAA University Division football season. In their 15th season under head coach Trevor J. Rees, the Golden Flashes compiled a 6–3 record (4–2 against MAC opponents), finished in third place in the MAC, and were outscored by all opponents by a combined total of 129 to 118.

The team's statistical leaders included Marty Grosjean with 482 rushing yards, Jim Flynn with 423 passing yards, and Bob Gusbar with 301 receiving yards. Offensive lineman Bob Gusbar was selected as a first-team All-MAC player.

Schedule

References

Kent State
Kent State Golden Flashes football seasons
Kent State Golden Flashes football